The United States Air Force Special Operations Training Center (AFSOTC) was located at Hurlburt Field, Florida. It worked under the supervision of the Air Force Special Operations Command (AFSOC); Its primary function was to train the Air Force's Special Operations Personnel before being assigned to their respective units. The Mission Statement/Vision was, "Transforming Airmen into Air Commandos who possess the specialized skills and warrior ethos to fight and win anytime, anywhere." The AFSOTC was replaced February 11, 2013 by the Air Force Special Operations Air Warfare Center.

History/Overview
The Training Center was set up on October 6, 2008. It was designed to consolidate the strengths of active duty, reserve, and Air National Guard units to form an integrated team dedicated to training Airmen and turning them into Air Commandos. Many units and squadrons make up the Training Center. These include The United States Air Force Special Operations School (USAFSOS), 5th Special Operations Squadron, 19th Special Operations Squadron, 371st Special Operations Combat Training Squadron, 551st Special Operations Squadron, 745th Special Operations Squadron, and an 18th Flight Test Squadron. In its short history, the Training Center  has already forever changed the way the Air Force educates and trains Special Forces personnel. With its 53 million dollar annual budget, the training center utilizes simulators, curriculum, and instructors to meet the Air Force's training needs. The Special Operations personnel trained at the center include Pararescuemen, Combat Controllers, and Special Operations Weathermen. The center also provides mission qualification for the U-28A, C-145A, C-146A, MQ-1, MQ-9, CV-22, MC-130E/H, AC-130H/U, AC-130W, RC-26 aircrews. One officer states, "There's an excellent team assembled here. So when a student graduates out of the training center, they will be an Air Commando and there will be no doubt that they're ready to join their respective combat units."

AFSOTC was inactivated on February 11, 2013, with the standup of the Air Force Special Operations Air Warfare Center (AFSOAWC).  Units and Squadrons were realigned under the command of the AFSOAWC.

Leadership
Outgoing AFSOTC Commander was Colonel William D. Andersen at the time of inactivation.

References

Centers of the United States Air Force
Military installations in Florida